Andrzej Chudziński (17 September 1948 – 4 September 1985) was a butterfly Polish swimmer. He competed in three events at the 1972 Summer Olympics.

References

External links
 

1948 births
1985 deaths
Polish male butterfly swimmers
Olympic swimmers of Poland
Swimmers at the 1972 Summer Olympics
Sportspeople from Gdynia
20th-century Polish people